Juan Sánchez, also Juan Sanchez (born July 1954) is an American artist and educator. He is an important Nuyorican cultural figure to emerge in the second half of the 20th century. His works include photography, paintings and mixed media works.

Biography 
Juan Sánchez was born on July 1954 in Brooklyn, New York. His parents are from Puerto Rico. Juan Sánchez earned his Bachelor of Fine Arts at Cooper Union in New York in 1977 and his Master of Fine Arts at Rutgers University's Mason Gross School of the Arts in 1980.

He is part of a generation of artists—such as Coco Fusco, Guillermo Gómez-Peña, Pepón Osorio and Papo Colo—who in the 1980s to 1990s explored questions of ethnic, racial and national identity in their work, be it through painting, video, performance or installation. Sánchez specifically became known for producing brightly hued mixed media canvases that addressed issues of Puerto Rican life in the U.S. and on the island. Of his work, critic Lucy Lippard once wrote: "it teaches us new ways of seeing what surrounds us."

Sanchez combines painting and photography with other media clippings and found objects to confront America's political policies and social practices concerning his parents' homeland of Puerto Rico. Sanchez often specifically addresses Puerto Rico's battle for independence and the numerous obstacles facing disadvantaged Puerto Ricans in America.

Sánchez is a professor of painting, photography and combined media at Hunter College in New York City.

His pieces are held in the collection of the Museum of Modern Art, the Metropolitan Museum of Art  and the Whitney Museum of American Art, among others.

Honors and awards
John Simon Guggenheim Foundation Fellowship, 1988
Joan Mitchell Foundation Fellowship, 1995
New York Foundation for the Arts Fellowship, 2003
Pollock-Krasner Foundation Grant, 2001 and 2007

Selected solo exhibitions
Juan Sánchez: Rican/Structed Convictions, Exit Art, New York, NY, 1989
Juan Sánchez: Printed Convictions/Convicciones Grabadas, Jersey City Museum, Jersey City, NJ, 1998
1898: Rican/Struction, Multilayered Impressions, BronxMuseum of Art, Bronx, NY, 1998
Juan Sánchez: Rican/Structions: Paintings of the 90’s, P.S. 1 Contemporary Art Center, Long Island City, NY, 1999
Juan Sánchez: Paintings, Prints, Poetry, Bernice Steinbaum Gallery, Miami, FL, 2001
Rican/Structions: A Selection of Works by Juan Sánchez, Bernstein Gallery, Woodrow Wilson School of Public and International Affairs, Princeton University, Princeton, NJ, 2003
The Masters Invitational: Juan Sánchez, Hewitt Gallery of Art, Marymount Manhattan College, New York, NY, 2006
TRIPTYCH/TRIPTICO: RETRATOS/PORTRAITS, Zoellner Arts Center Main Gallery, Lehigh University, Bethlehem, PA, 2009
Juan Sánchez: Unknown Boricuas + Prisoner: Abu Ghraib, at Lorenzo Homar Gallery, Taller Puertorriqueño, Philadelphia, PA, 2010
Juan Sánchez, “¿What’s The Meaning of This?”, BRIC House Gallery, Center for Puerto Rican Studies, New York, NY, 2015

References 

1954 births
Living people
20th-century American painters
American male painters
21st-century American painters
Painters from New York City
Hispanic and Latino American artists
20th-century American male artists